Ban Chimphli Railway Halt is a railway halt located in Chimphli Subdistrict, Taling Chan District, Bangkok, Thailand.

Train services 
 Ordinary 251/252 Bang Sue Junction–Prachuap Khiri Khan–Bang Sue Junction
 Ordinary 254/255 Lang Suan–Thon Buri–Lang Suan
 Ordinary 257/258 Thon Buri–Nam Tok–Thon Buri
 Ordinary 259/260 Thon Buri–Nam Tok–Thon Buri
 Ordinary 351/352 Thon Buri–Ratchaburi–Thon Buri
 Rapid 178 Lang Suan–Thon Buri
 Commuter 919/920 [1,2,3,4,5] Thon Buri–Salaya–Thon Buri

References 
 
 

Railway stations in Thailand